Akibat is a 1951 Indonesian film directed by Nawi Ismail. It stars Awaludin, A. Hadi, and Sukarsih.

References

External links

Indonesian drama films
1951 films